The 17 class  (formally H.373 class) was a class of steam locomotive built by the Vulcan Foundry for the New South Wales Government Railways of Australia.

History
Ordered from the Vulcan Foundry, 12 were placed in service in 1887. They had the 4-4-0 wheel arrangement that most locomotives had at the time. Shortly after delivery, the class leader was tested against the Baldwin Locomotive Works built L304 class to see which one could make a faster and better run across the Blue Mountains to Eskbank, with the Baldwin locomotive judged superior. They were also intended to haul passenger service on the steeply graded Sydney to Newcastle and Kiama lines.

They proved unpopular with both locomotive crews because of rough riding and track maintenance staff because of their high axle load and were displaced from mainline working and relegated to branch line work following the arrival of the P6 class (C32 class). In 1905/06, new boilers with Belpaire fireboxes were fitted, the smokeboxes shortened and the cylinder diameter reduced. In 1924, the class was renumbered becoming the Z17 class.

Demise and Preservation
As they became due for reboilering, they began to be withdrawn from January 1934 with only four in service by 1948.

See also
 NSWGR steam locomotive classification

References

Further reading

Full Steam across the Mountains by Phil Belpin

4-4-0 locomotives
Railway locomotives introduced in 1887
Standard gauge locomotives of Australia
17
Vulcan Foundry locomotives